The Pot of Basil may refer to a story in The Decameron or works inspired by it:

An important item in the fifth story on the fourth day; see Summary of Decameron tales#Fourth day
Isabella, or the Pot of Basil, 1818 poem by John Keats
Isabella and the Pot of Basil, 1868 painting by William Holman Hunt
Isabella (Millais painting), 1849 painting by John Everett Millais